Büyükpolatlı (also: Büyükbolat) is a village in the Sungurlu District of Çorum Province in Turkey. Its population is 138 (2022).

References

Villages in Sungurlu District